Victor Ma. Regis "Vico" Nubla Sotto (born June 17, 1989) is a Filipino politician serving as the incumbent mayor of Pasig. Sotto first entered politics when he ran for a seat on the Pasig City Council in 2016. He won the election as an independent and served a term in the city council. He joined the Aksyon Demokratiko party and was elected mayor of Pasig in 2019 with a platform focused on public consultation, data-driven governance, and universal health care in the city, which prioritizes housing programs, easier access to education, and cracking down on corruption. Sotto was re-elected in 2022; shortly afterwards, he resigned from Aksyon Demokratiko.

In 2021, the United States Department of State recognized Sotto as one of 12 recipients of the International Anticorruption Champions Award for his efforts toward anti-corruption.

Early life and career 
Sotto was born on June 17, 1989, to actor-comedian-host Vic Sotto and actress Coney Reyes, celebrities strongly associated with the noontime variety show Eat Bulaga!. The public expected that Sotto would make regular appearances on the show. However, he preferred to maintain a low profile with an early interest in government at the age of 10. Sotto attended Brent International School for most of his grade school and high school. He graduated from the Ateneo de Manila University in 2011 with a Bachelor of Arts in Political Science. Sotto later pursued a Master of Arts in Public Management at the Ateneo School of Government and graduated in 2018.

In 2018, Sotto received the prestigious YSEALI Professional Fellowship Award. He did his professional residency at the Iowa Public Information Board as part of the fellowship.

Prior to entering politics, Sotto taught social science at Arellano University for one semester.

Political career

Pasig City Council (2016–2019)
Sotto was elected as a member of Sangguniang Panlungsod (City Council) of Pasig in 2016, serving a single term before he was sworn in as Mayor on June 30, 2019.

As an independent Councilor, Sotto faced stiff opposition from his initiatives, making it difficult for him to introduce legislation.  He focused his attention on "The Pasig Transparency Mechanism Ordinance," which seeks the disclosure of public records, including financial documents and contracts, upon request by ordinary citizens. Upon its passage, it became the first-ever localized version of the freedom of information law in Metro Manila.

Mayor of Pasig (2019–present)

2019 campaign 
When Sotto ran for Mayor in Pasig in 2019, he campaigned on a platform called, "Big V" (Big Five) Agenda, which promotes universal healthcare, housing programs, education, public consultation, and anti-corruption efforts.

2019 campaign platform 
During the campaign, Sotto indicated that his top priority would be healthcare in Pasig as an anti-poverty measure. Despite the numerous health facilities in Pasig, he stressed the importance of adequately supplied medicine.

Another priority area for Sotto was housing. He assured the public that every family living in Pasig would eventually own their own house and promised that informal settlers would not be forced to leave their homes until primary services and livelihood could be assured at the selected relocation site.

As part of his platform on education, Sotto pledged to make scholarships more accessible to Pasig residents by simplifying the requirements in the application process. Among the requirements he singled out for removal was the requirement that parents submit copies of their voter's registration documents while applying for Pasig scholarships. To prepare for the upcoming school opening under the 'new normal,' Mayor Sotto was able to raise P1.2 billion to provide tablets and laptops to its public school students in elementary, junior and senior high school, and their teachers.

In response to the management style of the previous administration, Sotto also promised that all city government decisions would undergo a public consultation process. He also promised transparency in government projects, from planning to implementation, to monitoring and evaluation. More specific initiatives proposed by Sotto under this agenda item include public officials appointing members on local special bodies, and forming sectoral councils in areas such as transport and environmental protection, tasked with developing legislation in those areas.

Sotto also indicated that his administration's anti-corruption drive would begin with the establishment of a "Government Efficiency and Anti-Corruption Commission," the establishment of a Pasig anti-corruption hotline, and assurance that a non-governmental organization or civil society organization would watch over each of the city government's bidding processes.

A key strategy Sotto pledged to use to achieve his five-point campaign platform was data-driven governance. On the campaign trail, he stated that one of the roots of poor public service in Pasig was the culture of "palakasan," in which citizens exerted themselves to gain the favor of public officials to access services. Sotto's proposed solution to this problem was to ensure that decisions on the provision and prioritization of services would be based on data, rather than the political will or whims of officials.

2019 electoral victory 
Vico Sotto defeated incumbent mayor Robert Eusebio in the 2019 Pasig local elections, ending the 27-year rule of the Eusebio family over the Pasig mayoralty. He was sworn into office on June 30, 2019.

Early policies and positions

Policy against politicking 
Sotto received favorable press coverage when he issued a policy statement against the proliferation of political propaganda signages prior to his inauguration.  A supporter had taken the occasion of Sotto's 30th Birthday on July 17 to post a tarpaulin greeting the Mayor-elect on his birthday. A few days later, Sotto went on Twitter to request that the tarpaulin be removed, and asserting that such politically-oriented signage bearing his image would be discouraged during his term.

He has also made statements discouraging the "celebrity treatment" of politicians in the Philippines.

Reassessment of traffic management 
Sotto's first executive order upon being sworn in as Mayor was to put in place a Pasig City Traffic Management Task Force, which was tasked to "review and propose new solutions for the current mobility and traffic situation" within 45 days. The same executive order abolished the Pasig odd-even coding scheme, which the previous administration had implemented on top of the Metro Manila Development Authority's Traffic Coding Scheme – a double burden which Sotto had earlier decried as being "disjointed and unjust."

Picket line incidents 
Zagu Foods
On July 9, 2019, media reports noted that Sotto had visited protesters who were being forced away from their picket line in front of the main factory of Zagu Foods Corporation in Pasig. He reminded Zagu Foods' management that the protesters were within their rights to engage in protest activities.

Regent Foods
In November 2019, Sotto intervened in another picket line incident – this time with Regent Foods Corporation, 23 of whose workers were arrested after they clashed with company security guards and police officers while protesting the company's labor practices. Sotto called on Regency to "rethink on the charges it filed against its employees," issuing a statement claiming that "These people are not criminals; they do not have the goal of hurting you. They are fighting for what they believe to be just."  Sotto also said he was raising funds to bail out 23 arrested employees would need.

Crackdown on illegal POGO-related services 
In February 2020, Sotto again gained positive media reactions as a result of his efforts to crack down on illegally-operating businesses linked to Philippine Offshore Gaming Operators (POGOs). On February 23, Sotto ordered the closure Fu Yuan Ji, a restaurant catering to POGO employees, which opened without securing a permit from the city to operate.

COVID-19 crisis response 
Sotto received significant positive attention in both traditional and social media in response to Pasig's quick, data-driven responses to the COVID-19 pandemic, and the resulting 2020 Luzon enhanced community quarantine beginning March 17, 2020.

Before the Luzon quarantine 
National media outlets noted that prior to the national government's imposed community quarantine in Metro Manila, Sotto's administration prepared for the coming of COVID-19 by:
 asking experts to brief Pasig's health workers about COVID-19 cases;
 establishing and training COVID-19 response teams;
 providing a total of more than 1,000 sets of disinfecting kits to all of the Pasig's barangays; 
 disinfecting public places – from the public market and public schools to even streets and sidewalks, as well as Pasig City Hall;
 consulting the management of Pasig's private hospitals to ensure that they are prepared to accommodate more COVID-19 patients; and
 keeping Pasig constituents regularly informed about necessary precautions and updates about the situation through his official social media accounts.

During the Luzon quarantine 
Accounts also noted that once the enhanced community quarantine put in place on March 17, the Sotto administration:
 placed the city government on skeleton staff, in keeping with national policy, rearranging schedules so frontline government services could be sustained;
 ensured the full salaries of all city government employees;
 implemented a nightly 8 pm to 5 am curfew;
 implemented rules penalizing hoarders of essential goods;
 continued disinfecting operations in public places, and procured disinfectant drones so that hard-to-reach areas could be disinfected;
 established sanitation tents at the Pasig City Hall, Pasig City General Hospital (PCGH), and the Pasig City Children's Hospital (Child's Hope);
 distributed food packs and bottles of vitamins to Pasig residents; 
 arranged for the conversion of some motels within the city as quarantine facilities for COVID-19 patients;
 regularly inspected the checkpoints to make sure procedures were being followed and the rights of citizens were being respected despite the curfew; and
 regularly meeting the appropriate teams from The Medical City, PCGH, Child's Hope, and the City Health Office, to ensure proper coordination and the exchange of good practices in the pandemic response.

Transportation initiatives during the Luzon quarantine 
Sotto's administration also executed a number of transportation initiatives during the enhanced community quarantine. Most of these were generally praised, including the deployment of Pasig's fleet of buses to service essential workers, and the lending of "Pasig Bike Share" bicycle units to health workers and other frontline personnel.

One initiative that was questioned during the early days of the quarantine was that Pasig initially allowed limited motorized tricycle (tricycle) trips for people with legitimate reasons to commute, such as chemotherapy and other health issues. This was done on the basis of Pasig risk analysis, which determined that more residents would experience more severe health complications if they were deprived of transport services. Sotto thus went on national media pleading to the national government that an exception be made for Pasig's tricycles, based on the studies. However, on March 19, 2020, the national government informed Sotto that they insisted all forms of public transport, including tricycles, would be banned. Sotto immediately responded that Pasig would stop allowing tricycles to ply their routes.

In response to media coverage of this, private companies began donating vehicles such as Community Managed Electric Transport (COMET) bus units to augment Pasig's fleet of free rides that can be offered to the public. The city was eventually able to acquire e-tricycles, which were specifically assigned to provide free transportation for Pasig residents who had health and hospitalization needs such as dialysis or chemotherapy – the residents which the risk assessment determined would be endangered by the ban on tricycles.

Tricycle operations controversy 

On March 24, 2020, the Philippine legislature passed the Bayanihan to Heal as One Act which gave national government additional powers to combat the pandemic. The National Bureau of Investigation (NBI) invoked the said law on April 1, 2020 against Sotto, summoning him to appear at their office on April 7, claiming that he had violated the law's provision which bans public transportation. Sotto responded by claiming that he had complied with the national government's order to stop tricycle operations prior to the enactment of the law on March 25. Senate President Tito Sotto, an uncle of the mayor and a principal author of the law in question, supported his claim. Vice President Leni Robredo and Senator Francis Pangilinan were among the other politicians who questioned the NBI's actions, stating the unconstitutionality of criminalizing an act committed retroactively. Social media responded heavily with criticism towards the NBI for allegedly singling out the mayor, with the hashtag "#ProtectVico" trending on Twitter worldwide that day.

2022 reelection campaign 

In July 2021, Sotto announced his plans to run for reelection as Pasig mayor in the 2022 Pasig local elections. While he did not have a running mate for vice mayor in 2019, Sotto selected former Pasig representative Robert Jaworski Jr. as his running mate for vice mayor. They ran under the Giting ng Pasig (Bravery of Pasig) ticket. They were elected in the elections, defeating the ticket of incumbent vice mayor Iyo Bernardo and lawyer Ian Sia.

Political affiliation 
Sotto originally ran for a seat in the Sangguniang Panglungsod of Pasig as an independent, and won a seat without having any party affiliation.

In 2019, Sotto was sworn in as a member of Aksyon Demokratiko, a national political party founded by former Senator Raul Roco in 1997. He was sworn into the party alongside Roman Romulo, who would also win as representative in Pasig's sole legislative district; and Marielle del Rosario, who likewise ran as representative of Navotas. Sotto has refused to join bigger, more-established parties despite political pressure to do so, explaining that he chose to join the party because he shared its platform of pushing for freedom of information, political party reform, and the end of political dynasties. However, six months following his re-election as Pasig mayor in 2022, Sotto resigned from Aksyon Demokratiko, citing differences with the party regarding its direction and noted that "recent events have made it apparent" that its members were "no longer a group of individuals with similar political goals and ideals."

Electoral history 

|-
|colspan=7 bgcolor=black|

References

1989 births
Living people
Tagalog people
Mayors of Pasig
Filipino Christians
Filipino evangelicals
21st-century Filipino politicians
Independent politicians in the Philippines
Vico
Aksyon Demokratiko politicians
Ateneo de Manila University alumni
Metro Manila city and municipal councilors
21st-century Filipino educators